The Rural Municipality of Hillsdale No. 440 is a rural municipality (RM) in the Canadian province of Saskatchewan within Census Division No. 13 and  Division No. 6.

History 
The RM of Hillsdale No. 440 incorporated as a rural municipality on January 1, 1913.

Geography

Communities and localities 
The following urban municipalities are surrounded by the RM.

Villages
 Neilburg

The following unincorporated communities are within the RM.

Localities
 Baldwinton
 Carruthers
 Freemont
 Lilydale

Lakes and rivers
The following is a list of notable lakes and rivers in the RM:
Manitou Lake
Maidstone Lake
Soda Lake
Collie Lake
Prince Lake
Yellowsnake Lake
Battle River
Poundmaker Creek

Demographics 

Government 
The RM of Hillsdale No. 440 is governed by an elected municipal council and an appointed administrator that meets on the first Thursday after the first Tuesday of every month. The reeve of the RM is Glenn Goodfellow while its administrator is Janet L. Hollingshead. The RM's office is located in Neilburg.

Transportation 
The following is a list of Saskatchewan highways in the RM:
 Saskatchewan Highway 21
 Saskatchewan Highway 40
 Saskatchewan Highway 675

See also 
List of rural municipalities in Saskatchewan

References 

H

Division No. 13, Saskatchewan